Paula Cole (born April 5, 1968) is an American singer-songwriter. After gaining attention for her performances as a vocalist on Peter Gabriel's 1993–1994 Secret World Tour, she released her first album, Harbinger, which suffered from a lack of promotion when the label, Imago Records, folded shortly after its release.  Her second album, This Fire (1996), brought her worldwide acclaim, peaking at number 20 on the Billboard 200 album chart and producing two hit singles, the triple-Grammy nominated "Where Have All the Cowboys Gone?", which reached the top ten of the Billboard Hot 100 in 1997, and "I Don't Want to Wait", which was used as the theme song of the television show Dawson's Creek.  She won the Grammy Award for Best New Artist in 1998.

Her third album, 1999's Amen, marked a major stylistic departure for Cole, and this alienated many of her former fans; the album sales were disappointing compared to the multi-Platinum sales of her prior effort.  She has since released several more albums, including the jazz-influenced Courage (2007) and Ithaca (2010), which marked a return to her 1990s folk-rock sound.  Her most recent release was titled American Quilt, and came out in May 2021.  Besides recording and performing, Cole has also served on the faculty at Berklee College of Music since 2013.

Early life 
Cole was raised in Rockport, Massachusetts, United States; her mother, Stephanie Cole, a mixed media artist, was an elementary school art teacher, and her father, Jim Cole, was a professor of biology and ecology at Salem State College, and he played bass in the polka band "Johnny Prytko and the Connecticut Hi-Tones". Her older sister Irene played piano.

She attended Rockport High School where she was president of her senior class and performed in school theatrical productions such as South Pacific. Cole then attended Berklee College of Music in Boston, where she studied jazz singing and improvisation with Bob Stoloff. She sang jazz standards at lounges and nightclubs. She was offered a record deal by the jazz label GRP Records, but decided to turn it down.

After graduating Berklee, she moved to San Francisco and began working on song ideas. She lived with three roommates and ate meagerly, building up her home studio and writing down song ideas including one that later became "Where Have All the Cowboys Gone?" Impressing label president Terry Ellis with her demo performances, she signed with his Imago Records in 1992, and was coached by veteran artist's manager John Carter on the album project that would become Harbinger.

Career

1993–1998: Harbinger and This Fire 
Cole got her first big professional break when she was invited to perform on Peter Gabriel's 1993–94 Secret World Tour. To replace Sinéad O'Connor who left the tour, Gabriel sought Cole on the recommendation of his studio engineer Kevin Killen. Gabriel left an answering machine message for her at her apartment in San Francisco, and she immediately flew to Mannheim, Germany, for her only rehearsal with Gabriel, shortly before performing in front of 16,000 people.

Cole joined the two last legs of Peter Gabriel's 1993–94 Secret World tour. A video of the concert was shot just days after Cole joined the tour. The video was released as Secret World Live, with Cole covering all the primary female vocals and featured in duets with Gabriel, especially the songs "Don't Give Up" on which she sang the part that Kate Bush recorded with Gabriel in 1986, and "Blood of Eden" recorded by Gabriel and Sinéad O'Connor in 1992. The film received the 1996 Grammy Award for Best Long Form Music Video. Cole was also the main female vocalist on Secret World Live, the audio album documenting the tour. The tour gave Cole international exposure as well as experience performing on a large stage. Her performance earned high praise: in a retrospective review, PopMatters wrote that Cole was "one of the real stars" on the tour, that she easily handled Kate Bush's parts, and that she was "maybe a superior vocalist" to Sinéad O'Connor.

Shortly after the tour, Cole released her first album Harbinger in 1994.  She appeared with Melissa Etheridge to sing a duet on VH1. Imago Records went out of business a few months after the album came out. In 1995, Cole signed on to Warner Bros. Records. Warner reissued Harbinger in the autumn of 1995.

Harbinger featured songs dwelling on Cole's personal thoughts on discrimination and unhappiness. The songs were musically lush but driven and bleak. The accompanying artwork featured photographs of Cole with a boyishly short haircut, wearing loose fitting black sweatclothes, combat boots and nose ring. The Imago label folded and promotion of Harbinger was limited, affecting its sales. A single, "I Am So Ordinary", was released with a black-and-white video that reflected the album's artwork.

In late 1996, Cole released her second album on Warner, This Fire, which was entirely self-produced. The album's debut single, "Where Have All the Cowboys Gone?", went to No. 8 on Billboard magazine's pop chart. The follow-up single "I Don't Want to Wait" reached No. 11, its popularity bolstered by its use as the theme song for the hit teen drama series Dawson's Creek which debuted over a year after the album. The single "Me" (No. 35 Airplay chart) was also released as a radio-only single. The title "Hush, Hush, Hush", a duet with Peter Gabriel, talks about AIDS and about a young man dying in his father's comforting arms. "Feelin' Love" was a single that was included on the soundtrack to City of Angels.

Cole was a featured artist on Sarah McLachlan's Lilith Fair during its prototype year, 1996, and for the major tours of 1997 and 1998. She was nominated for several Grammy Awards in 1997. Among them was "Producer of the Year" (Cole was the third woman to ever be nominated in this category after Janet Jackson in 1990 and Mariah Carey in 1992); she did not win, but she did go on to win "Best New Artist" that same year.

1999–2006: Amen, hiatus, and motherhood 

Cole took a hiatus to raise her daughter, Sky. In 1999 Cole released Amen with the newly formed Paula Cole Band. The album's debut single "I Believe In Love" was initially not a success but was remixed by producer Jonathan Peters into a successful dance song. The song "Be Somebody" was featured and performed by Paula and the band at P3 on the hit TV show Charmed in 2000. The album which had guest appearances by DJ Premier and long-time Cole fan Tionne Watkins featured some R&B and hip-hop influences but failed to match the success of This Fire. A fourth album was recorded with Hugh Padgham but the label refused to release it; in 2005 Cole uploaded one of the tracks, "Singing Out My Life", to her own website to get her sound heard. She also recorded a song called "It's My Life" during these sessions, which can be heard in Mercury automobile commercials. Cole also made a home recording of a song protesting President Bush and the Iraq War titled "My Hero, Mr. President!", which she posted on her website.

2007–2013: Courage, Ithaca, and Raven 
Cole returned in June 2007 with her fourth studio album Courage, which was released on Decca Records and produced by Bobby Colomby at the Capitol Studios in Hollywood.

Cole's fifth studio album, Ithaca, was released September 21, 2010. She wrote and co-produced all of the songs on the album. Cole says it "represents that inner fortitude and the journey I've been on."

Raven is Cole's sixth studio album. It was funded by a Kickstarter campaign which ran from September 22 to October 29, 2012, and raised $75,258. The album was released on April 23, 2013, on her 675 label. Cole wrote the 11 songs on the album including two from early in her career, "Imaginary Man" and "Manitoba". Her mother had saved these songs on cassette tapes. Most of the album was recorded in one week at a barn in Massachusetts. The musicians included co-producer/drummer Ben Wittman, guitarist Kevin Barry and bassist Tony Levin. She has worked with Wittman and Barry since she was 19.

2014–2018: 7, This Bright Red Feeling, and Ballads 

7 is Cole's seventh studio album released on March 23, 2015, via Cole's website and to other digital music outlets on April 10, 2015. In Cole's words, it is "a collection of songs that came suddenly and urgently. The songs demanded to be written and released, as if my subconscious needed to reach out to me; to tell me what it thought about all I was going through. I recorded this album live, as an acoustic quartet. It sounds like a soft, soulful album made in the 1960s and the songs speak for themselves."

Cole announced that she was selling her new live album This Bright Red Feeling exclusively on CD at live shows and at her website, with intentions to put it online for digital sale soon. The album is a recording of her live New York City show on May 1, 2016, but also includes re-recordings of two of her biggest commercial hits. The album's title comes from a lyric from her song Tiger.

Cole announced a new Kickstarter project on June 16, 2016, for a covers studio album, Ballads. It raised $76,899. The album was released on August 11, 2017. The first single, a cover of Billie Holiday's "God Bless the Child", was released on June 1.

2019: Revolution 
Paula Cole released her ninth studio album, Revolution, on September 13, 2019, on 675 Records.

2021: American Quilt 
An article from The Independent has stated that Paula is due to release a new studio album, in 2021, titled American Quilt. The same article detailed streaming issues with Dawson's Creek, and the initial omission of "I Don't Want To Wait" as the original theme. Ostensibly the entire issue boils down to money, and attempted cost-saving at Warner Bros Television. Paula announced in January 2021 that a "verbal agreement" has been reached for the use of Cole's re-recorded version of the theme, taken from This Bright Red Feeling.

This album was released in 2021.

Other activities 
Cole performed a two-hour set at Berklee Performance Center in Boston, Massachusetts on February 16, 2007, during which she debuted several songs from her upcoming fourth studio album, Courage. The set began with a solo piano version of "Where Have All the Cowboys Gone?", which was replayed by the full band toward the end of the concert. Her performance was reviewed favorably in The Boston Globe on February 19, 2007. In March 2007, her official MySpace page previewed three new songs from Courage: "Comin' Down", "El Greco", and the album's first single, entitled "14".

Cole is a member of the Canadian charity Artists Against Racism, and worked with them on a radio public service announcement.

On July 10, 2007, Cole sang "God Bless America" during the seventh-inning stretch of the 2007 Major League Baseball All-Star Game. In August 2007, Cole toured with Mandy Moore, playing mid-size venues in the western United States.

On June 17, 2008, she sang "The Star-Spangled Banner" at Game 6 of the NBA Finals in Boston. In August 2008 and 2009, Cole continued to tour and promote her CD Courage.

Since 2013, Cole has been on the voice faculty at Berklee College of Music while continuing an active performing career.

Personal life 
In June 2002, Cole married Moroccan musician Hassan Hakmoun, whom she had met on the Secret World Tour in 1994. The couple divorced in 2007. They have one daughter, Sky, born in 2001.

Discography

Studio albums 
 Harbinger (1994 – Imago/Warner Bros. Records)
 This Fire (1996 – Imago / Warner Bros.)
 Amen (1999 – Imago / Warner Bros.)
 Courage (2007 – Decca)
 Ithaca (2010 – Decca)
 Raven (2013 – 675 Records)
 7 (2015 – 675 Records)
 Ballads (2017 – 675 Records)
 Revolution (2019 – 675 Records)
 American Quilt (2021 – 675 Records, distribution through Renew Records, BMG)

Live album 
 This Bright Red Feeling (2016 – 675 Records)

Singles

Awards and nominations

Notes

References

External links 

1968 births
20th-century American singers
21st-century American singers
Living people
Grammy Award winners
American women singer-songwriters
Record producers from Massachusetts
Berklee College of Music alumni
People from Rockport, Massachusetts
Warner Records artists
Columbia Records artists
Decca Records artists
Hollywood Records artists
Singer-songwriters from Massachusetts
20th-century American women singers
American pop pianists
21st-century American women singers
21st-century American pianists
American women record producers
20th-century women pianists
21st-century women pianists